"Love Me Anyway" is a 2019 song by Pink.

Love Me Anyway may also refer to:
 "Love Me Anyway", a 2012 song by Mary Ann Redmond, recorded as a French duet "L'amour peut prendre froid" by Celine Dion and Johnny Hallyday 
 "Love Me Anyway", a 2015 song by Ginny Blackmore from her album, Over the Moon
 "Love Me Anyway", a 2019 song by Conrad Sewell from his album Life